Rogoznica is a small settlement in the Municipality of Lenart in northeastern Slovenia. It lies in the Slovene Hills at the source of Rogoznica Creek, a minor left tributary of the Drava River that flows into the Drava at Lake Ptuj. The area is part of the traditional region of Styria. It is now included in the Drava Statistical Region.

References

External links
Rogoznica on Geopedia

Populated places in the Municipality of Lenart